Concord is an unincorporated community in Concord Township, DeKalb County, Indiana.

History
A post office was established at Concord in 1876, and remained in operation until it was discontinued in 1929. The community took its name from Concord Township.

Geography

References

Unincorporated communities in DeKalb County, Indiana
Unincorporated communities in Indiana